Athena is a fictional deity appearing in American comic books published by Marvel Comics. She is based on the Greek Goddess of the same name.

Publication history
Athena first appeared in The Mighty Thor #164 (May 1969), and was adapted from Greek mythology by writer Stan Lee and artist Jack Kirby.

Fictional character biography
Athena is the daughter of Zeus and Metis, having emerged fully formed from her father's brow after Zeus consumed Metis in hopes of avoiding a male child who would succeed him, as he had his father.  She took the place of the goddess of wisdom, war, and heroic endeavor in the Olympian pantheon. Her grey owl companion is named Pallas, a reference to her own name.

In her first appearance, Athena stood alongside Zeus when he forbade Pluto from interfering on Earth. She then observed Pluto's later conflict with Zeus. Athena later accompanied Zeus to a meeting with Odin, who had requested Olympian aid in opposing the Eternals. As a result, she participated in the assault on the Eternal home city of Olympia, and fought her counterpart among the Eternals, Thena, for whom she evinces tremendous dislike.

Athena later battled Thor when Zeus had convinced her that the Avengers were enemies of Olympus. The battle ended when Thor saved her from a pool of molten metal in Hephaestus' workshop, and she realized that Thor was not her enemy. Athena, Hephaestus, and Venus went with the Avengers to heal the wounded Hercules, but Zeus was at his bedside and blasted them all with lightning. Zeus then forbade Athena and all Olympians from interfering with the Earth.

In modern times, Athena is responsible for Aegis gaining his superhuman powers from her gift of her aegis breastplate.

Athena later battled Pluto, and then met with the other Olympian gods to discuss their distaste at Ares' brutality. When Olympus was then invaded by Mikaboshi's demons, Athena fought for Olympus and looked to Ares for battlefield strategy. Athena joined the Olympians in battle against Mikaboshi's forces, and prevailed with the aid of the benevolent gods of the east.

She next appeared in The Incredible Hercules, offering shelter to Hercules and Amadeus Cho at her estate in Vermont, and warning Hercules about both Ares, and Amadeus' potential for becoming good or evil. After Hercules and Amadeus ultimately make it to her estate, she warns them of the threat of the Secret Invasion, and takes them to San Francisco, to convene a meeting of Earth's various pantheons, in the shadow of the Dreaming Celestial to discuss the threat. Following the "God Squad"'s victory, and Mikaboshi's takeover of the Skrull slave deities, Athena is shown watching from her scrying pool, and she says that this is an even better result than she had planned for. She expresses no alarm or shock when Mikaboshi vows to get revenge on the Olympians. Athena is thus confirmed not to be a Skrull.

In the past, she was shown using her foresight to predict the birth of Amadeus Cho and the events of the World War Hulk, predicting that while the still young Hercules would grow to be a force for good, Amadeus would always be her champion, foretelling the modern times and his final choosing in becoming a force for good himself, and her and Hercules' helper. Thus she accepted him as her helper.

The Olympus Group
Meanwhile, Hera and Pluto have taken over the Olympus Group, the modern day seat of power for the Olympians, via the inherited shares of Zeus' and by buying out Poseidon, and have decided the company has a new major goal: the deaths of Athena and Hercules. As a part of her master plan, Hera kills Aegis, a hero favored by Athena. Using his body as a bait, she lures Athena, Amadeus and Hercules into a trap. Among Hera's retinue is Delphyne Gorgon, who wishes to kill Athena in revenge for her cursing the original Gorgons. Athena formulates a new plan to counter Hera, and the heroes escape in the midst of a battle between Hera's forces and the Dark Avengers.

When they arrive in Atlantic City, Athena revealed that she's sending them to Hades to retrieve Zeus. They are successful and Zeus is reborn as a young boy, although without his memories, but he still has weather control. As Amadeus leaves them to find his sister, Athena and Hercules race to hide Zeus with The Mighty Avengers.  Cho, meanwhile, departs to uncover the truth behind his parents' death and his sister's disappearance, uncertain whether to trust her any longer.  Subsequently, he learns that in fact Athena has been posing as an ally of his, former FBI Agent Sexton, to aid him on his adventure, and that she intervened even earlier to save his life from the murder attempt that killed his family. It is revealed that Pythagoras Dupree was Athena's original choice to be her champion, but he refused the position, and, retreating inside an elaborate web of realities, began killing anyone who could possibly lead Athena to him. Cho, after confronting Dupree, rejoins Athena, and shares with her information about Hera's superweapon, Continuum.

Athena reveals to Cho that he is her choice to be the next Prince of Power, as the 'hero of the mind', as opposed to the hero of strength that Hercules represented. Further, as there cannot be more than one Prince of Power at any one time, this means that Hercules will soon meet his death. Cho vows to prevent this, even as they gather forces to mount an assault on New Olympus. Athena provides Aphrodite with information on her enemies, the Agents of Atlas, in exchange for her distracting Ares from joining the battle. Using the aegis breastplate taken from Aegis, Hephaestus forged a helmet channeling the power of the Medusa head, which Delphyne used to turn Athena to stone. Hephaestus then planned on creating a mold of her face to place on one of his automatons to bring with him to the new universe. However, she is freed from this by the death of Zeus, which transfers his divine thunderbolt to her, she then starts calling herself Athena Panhellenios. After Hercules defeats Typhon within the alternate universe Hera's machine created, Athena reveals that Hercules must die so that Cho can take his place as Prince of Power, and, tearfully saying that she considers herself Hercules' real mother and that she fed him Hera's milk to increase his power, she destroys the machine, seemingly killing him. Athena later attends Hercules's funeral with Neptune, Hebe, Apollo and Pluto, presenting Amadeus Cho (whose own relationship with her has been deeply strained due to Hercules's demise and her initial lack of attendance at his funeral), with an offer to have him serve as the new head of their Olympus Group. Apollo challenges Athena for leadership of the Olympians, leading a brawl between various champions, with Athena and her allies triumphing. Cho initially declines her offer, but accepts upon learning that Hercules is not in the Underworld, vowing to use the Groups' resources to locate him.

Now the leader of the Olympians, Athena is shown meeting with the Council of Godheads to discuss the new Heroic Age, and who should be selected to confront the coming darkness of Mikaboshi. Other Skyfathers suggest Thor, Iron Man, and Captain America, but Athena states that Cho will save the world. Subsequently, upon Vali Halfling's capture of the Olympus Group headquarters, Athena is severely weakened by the snuffing of the Promethean Flame, and is then captured by Halfling's men upon returning to the Olympus Group from the panicked Council of Godheads. Delphyne Gorgon, who escaped her cell, at first confronted Athena, but was then convinced to help her defeat Halfling's men and attempt to locate the Flame. Following Cho and Delphyne's defeat of Halfling, the Flame is restored by Cho's new divine powers and Athena returns to her full power, released from captivity, just as the Chaos King Amatsu-Mikaboshi prepares to invade Earth, destroy every trace of life in the Marvel Universe, mortal and immortal, and annihilate all reality at long last in his devastating Chaos War.

During the Chaos War storyline, Sersi asked Hercules why wise Athena was not with him and Amadeus. Hercules told her that Athena tried to kill him, and had fled when he returned to Earth. After Amatsu-Mikaboshi decimates the realms of Earth's pantheons and seemingly absorbs the God Squad into his own void, Athena (with her pet owl Pallas) appears to him, telling him to focus on only Hercules and Cho, his two true threats, and that none of this would have been possible if not for the wisdom of his "greatest servant". Athena insists to Amatsu-Mikaboshi that he would need her aid in the final battle to destroy Hercules, telling him that Creation would simply emerge from his void even if he did triumph, but the Chaos King enslaves her in turn. Athena brutally attacks Hercules with all her power, screaming that she exiled him to Hera's Continuum bubble universe because she sought to protect him from the Chaos King, but even in death, Hercules was as stubborn as he was in life. Hercules, with the help of Gaea and her daughter Pele, destroys and recreates himself with the full power of Skyfather, casually annihilating Athena with one gesture.

Though the combined efforts of Hercules, Cho, and their God Squad, bolstered by the aid of Earth's few surviving gods, are unable to stop Amatsu-Mikaboshi, they manage to trick Amatsu-Mikaboshi into returning the Continuum bubble reality back into the Primordial Void instead of their own universe, whereupon an apparently restored Athena appears to Hercules, revealing that she had seen what could have happened all along, and that long had she been planning for her brother to rise forth as Skyfather of a new and cleansed world, as "the greatest of men" and "the greatest of gods". However, overriding her protests, Hercules instead sacrifices all his divine power and immortality to undo all the damage that the Chaos King had wrought upon Creation and raise Olympus upon Earth. With Delphyne still trapped in her cursed guise, Athena still lives even after the end of the Chaos War, although with Zeus and Hera's restoration to high power, she is no longer the Olympian Godhead.

Powers and abilities
Athena is the mistress of many forms of knowledge. She is an extraordinary swordswoman, combat strategist, and hand-to-hand combatant. As the goddess of wisdom, Athena has devoted a great deal of time throughout the centuries to studying and mastering many areas of knowledge including all fields of non-technical science, the arts, literature, and humanities. Also, as the goddess of battle, Athena is highly adept at multiple forms of combat both armed and unarmed, possessing fighting skills eclipsing those of even gods as her brother Hercules, but not of the likes of such as Asgardians Odin and Thor, and is a highly competent military strategist even superior to her half-brother Ares, being a super-genius even among the deities of Earth and possessing a degree of "cosmic awareness" that renders her essentially omniscient when using it, claiming to simultaneously run ninety-seven plans to "save the world" through her head at any moment. She is a master of the weapons used at the time of ancient Greece and Rome including the sword, spear, and shield (though has, in both ancient and modern times, preferred using only a mace and roundshield in combat in most instances), and has also demonstrated some level of proficiency with archery and horseback riding whilst on Olympus. While Athena does not project energy in the form of bolts often, she has done so while in combat with Thena during the assault on the Eternals of Olympia, albeit through her sword.

Athena possesses the conventional powers of the Olympian gods including superhuman strength, speed, agility, reflexes and stamina, the inability to age upon reaching adulthood as a sign of true immortality, immunity to terrestrial diseases and harm from conventional means and a regenerative ability that heals wounds rapidly should she indeed be injured, although she cannot regrow limbs. Even on Earth, she appears to still possess the power of immortality, as she survived a massive explosion caused by Pythagoras Dupree that was sufficient to annihilate an entire town, and her physical durability and resilience is such that Athena is bulletproof, more resistant to harm than even gods such as Apollo and Hermes and as much so as Ares. Athena is significantly stronger than the average Olympian female and somewhat stronger than the average Olympian male. Even on Earth, after many months, Athena has shown herself to retain some degree of superhuman strength, such as hurling her mace with such force it causes an explosion on a highly advanced Atlantean aircraft.

Athena possesses considerable magical abilities as an Olympian goddess. She can fly at great speed, change her size or form to appear as another person, animal or object, even altering her hair color on certain occasions (though her transmutation abilities have been described as "limited"), render herself and other beings invisible from mortal eyesight (for example when she was a secret participant in the Trojan War), create illusory images, animate inanimate objects, and control the shape and form of objects or people (notably she changed the physical appearance of Trey Rollins, the New Warrior youth aka Aegis). Athena can also project mystical energy bolts, cross the distance between dimensions (as well as grant others unlimited passage to and from the realm of Olympus, as she did with Trey Rollins) and materialize objects, as well as one time empowering the mortal Prince Argive so he could strike Ares a near-fatal wound. Athena has also cast permanent curses upon mortals, such as her enchantment which struck Teiresias blind but also opened his ears to the whispers of the gods, making him a great prophet, as well as casting the spell on Arachne that changed her into a spider, and placing the curse upon Medusa Gorgon and all her descendants that stripped them of their beauty and made them into monsters, a curse which apparently cannot be broken through any scientific means, as the Delphyne Gorgon has claimed that the Gorgons have tried dozens of times in the past millennia without any success, leading them to believe that the only way to undo her spell would be to slay her, or, as proved to be the case, turn Athena into stone by channeling the power of Medusa herself. Athena's ability to project mystical energy is considered among the greatest of the Olympians, surpassed only by a few special deities of her pantheon, such as Zeus, Hera, Pluto, Poseidon, and Apollo. She is also accompanied by her sacred pet owl, Pallas, who is either perched on her shoulder or deployed in the field to gather intelligence.

While she joined with Hercules and Amadeus Cho, she has yet to demonstrate such wide use of her godly abilities (possibly greatly weakened on Earth, as in the case of the other Olympians and most Asgardians), though she has most commonly used it to change from her regular mortal garb into full battle armor or disguise herself as humans (such as Agent Sexton) as well as summon her mace and shield. She has also shown herself capable of pinpointing the current location of the Aegis breastplate mentally, as if it was her "own skin", and once vanished into thin air, apparently teleporting herself away, after speaking with Amadeus Cho. Athena also bears the gift of foresight, which she used to predict the future birth of Amadeus Cho and his eventual role as the Prince of Power, several millennia later, and is able to project images of such futures in thin air at will, and is also capable of engaging in aerial combat when necessary, even after many months on Earth, as she has shown when battling a group of harpies, demonstrating the ability of flight.

Athena possesses a scrying pool, enabling her to see into other dimensions, even into the dimensions of alien Skrull deities virtually unreachable, without detection.

Following the death of both Zeus and Hera, Athena has inherited Zeus's divine thunderbolt and is now capable of wielding it, making her the new Godhead for the remaining members of the Greek pantheon and the Queen of Olympus, raising her power to a much higher scale, potentially on a level to that of the other members of the Council Elite. Athena has since assumed the new godly title of Athena Panhellenios. Since then, Athena has shown herself capable of easily teleporting herself away, force back the gathered mourners at her temple, even Thor himself (whilst armed with her Thunderbolt), contact others on Earth from the Celestial Axis of the Council Elite by projecting her image in a scrying screen in midair and voice across planes of existence, and, even in a severely weakened state following the quenching of the Promethean Flame, was able to open a gateway between the Celestial Axis (meeting place of the Council Elite) and the Olympus Group headquarters in the Earth dimension. Her blessing that made Amadeus the new Prince of Power was also potent enough to shield him from the Chaos King's strike on the minds of Earth's mortals using the powers he claimed from the slain Nightmare, and she was able to project a minor projection of the Creation event to the Chaos King over her hand.

Reception

Accolades 

 In 2019, CBR.com ranked Athena 7th in their "Marvel Comics: The 10 Most Powerful Olympians" list.
 In 2021, CBR.com ranked Athena 5th in their "Marvel: 10 Most Powerful Olympians" list.
 In 2021, CBR.com ranked Athena 3rd in their "Marvel: 10 Smartest Female Characters" list.
 In 2022, Screen Rant included Athena in their "10 Most Powerful Olympian Gods In Marvel Comics" list.
 In 2022, Sportskeeda ranked Athena 4th in their "10 best Greek gods from Marvel comics " list.

References

Athena
Characters created by Jack Kirby
Characters created by Stan Lee
Classical mythology in Marvel Comics
Comics characters introduced in 1969
Fictional archers
Fictional characters who can change size
Fictional characters with superhuman durability or invulnerability
Fictional goddesses
Fictional military strategists
Fictional women soldiers and warriors
Greek and Roman deities in fiction
Marvel Comics characters who are shapeshifters
Marvel Comics characters who can move at superhuman speeds
Marvel Comics characters who use magic
Marvel Comics characters with superhuman strength
Marvel Comics female superheroes
Marvel Comics martial artists